Muawieh Khalid Radaideh is the Jordanian Minister of Environment. He was appointed as minister on 11 October 2021.

Education 
Radaideh holds a PhD in Civil and Environmental Engineering from the Brigham Young University.

References 

Living people
21st-century Jordanian politicians
Government ministers of Jordan
Environment ministers of Jordan
Year of birth missing (living people)

Brigham Young University alumni